State Highway 34 (SH 34) is a State Highway in Kerala, India that starts in Koyilandy and ends in Edavanna. The highway is 44.0 km long.

Route map 
Koyilandy town – Ulliyeri town – Balusseri town – Vattoli Bazaar – Ekarool – Poonoor town – Thamarassery  – Omassery – Mukkam – Areekode joins SH 29 – Edavanna junction (joins Kozhikode – Nilambur  – Gudalloor highway)

See also 
SHMGVHSS (VHSE) EDAVANNA
Roads in Kerala
List of State Highways in Kerala

References 

State Highways in Kerala
Roads in Kozhikode
Roads in Malappuram district
Roads in Kannur district